The women's 1500 metres event  at the 1997 IAAF World Indoor Championships was held on March 8–9.

Doping disqualification
The silver medal had originally been won by Mary Slaney of the United States, but she was later found guilty of a doping offense and stripped of it.

Medalists

Results

Heats
First 4 of each heat (Q) and next 4 fastest (q) qualified for the final.

Final

References

1500
1500 metres at the World Athletics Indoor Championships
1997 in women's athletics